The Luzerner Schilling (or Luzernerchronik, Lucerne chronicle) is an illuminated manuscript of 1513, containing the chronicle of the history of the Swiss Confederation written by Diebold Schilling the Younger of Lucerne.

The chronicle is an impressive volume containing 443 colourful full-page miniature illustrations and 237 text pages, which cover the whole history of the Confederation, but with more space given to events of the previous forty years.

Diebold, through his father and his uncle Diebold Schilling the Elder, came into contact with the art of chronicle book illustration as it had evolved in Alsace under the influence of Burgundy, in works like the Froissart of Louis of Gruuthuse (BnF Fr 2643-6). Both the illustrations and the accompanying narratives are remarkably lively and realistic. Two painters can be distinguished, one keeping in the more traditional gothic style of manuscript illumination - this is believed to be Schilling himself - while the other develops a new, specifically Swiss artistic style that culminates in the works of Niklaus Manuel Deutsch and Hans Holbein the Younger in the mid-16th century.

A reproduction was published in 1932 on the occasion of the 600th anniversary of the accession of Lucerne to the Swiss Confederacy, and a full colour facsimile by the Faksimile Verlag of Lucerne in 1981.

See also
 Swiss illustrated chronicles

Literature
Paul Ganz, The Lucerne Chronicle of Diebold Schilling, The Burlington Magazine (1933).

External links

e-codices - Virtual Manuscript Library of Switzerland
Facsimile

Swiss illustrated chronicles